Sergiy Stakhovsky and Tomáš Zíb were the defenders of title, but they didn't play this time.
Jan Hájek and Robin Vik won in the final 6–2, 6–4, against Matúš Horecný and Tomáš Janci.

Seeds

Draw

Draw

References
 Doubles Draw

Prosperita Open - Doubles
2009 Doubles